Jonathan Ackley is an American interactive theme park attraction and computer game designer, writer, and programmer. He is best known for being the Creative Director and Producer on Walt Disney World's Sorcerers of the Magic Kingdom and co-project leader, with Larry Ahern, for LucasArts Games The Curse of Monkey Island.

He is an inventor who holds or co-holds more than 35 patents, including for novel game interfaces, theme park systems, rides and attractions, interactive merchandise, RFID, bar codes, consumer media platforms, mobile-powered reservation systems, and parental controls for cellular phones.

Career
Jonathan Ackley began his career as a programmer at LucasArts on Day of the Tentacle in 1993.

He was co-project leader on The Curse of Monkey Island in 1997, an animated pirate adventure that received critical acclaim. The Curse of Monkey Island was nominated for or won many industry awards, including  "best adventure game of 1997" by Computer Games Strategy Plus, Computer Gaming World, and PC Gamer US, and GameSpot, which said "The Curse of Monkey Island has all the makings of a classic."

He worked as an associate game designer for Rocket Science Games on Cadillacs and Dinosaurs: The Second Cataclysm in 1994.  While there, he was an Associate Game Designer and also a voice actor for the game Loadstar: The Legend of Tully Bodine, playing the role of "Scorpion."

For Mindstorms, the LEGO company's flagship toy robotics line, Ackley crafted the interfaces for Mindstorms' "Robotics Invention System 2.0" and "Mindstorms Vision Command."

Starting in 2001, Mr. Ackley joined Walt Disney Imagineering creating interactive entertainment for their amusement parks.  In this function, he co-designed Walt Disney World's Sorcerers of the Magic Kingdom with his former Curse of Monkey Island co-lead, Larry Ahern, in 2012. "Insidethemagic.net" called him the "Sorcerer behind 'Sorcerers'" in a 2012 interview with Ackley.

As a Disney Imagineer, Ackley played a major design role in a number of innovative attractions. These included:

 Led the technology team for the Disney Company's Interactive Television Platform.
 Designer and Producer for the THEA Award-winning Kim Possible's World Showcase Adventure at EPCOT. This successful in-park high-tech scavenger hunt was later re-imagined as "Agent P's World Showcase Adventure with Phineas and Ferb," which also met with critical and popular acclaim. In a June 2012 interview, Ackley said of the "Agent P" experience, "From a WDI standpoint, the focus is always on the storyline and not the technology."
 Designed the Leonardo Challenge at Tokyo Disney Sea
 Was a show writer for the interactive queue at the Haunted Mansion at the Magic Kingdom
 Designed the Midship Detective Agency game on the Disney Cruise ships
 Designed and Produced The Sorcerers of the Magic Kingdom in the Magic Kingdom Park
 Designed and Produced the attraction "A Pirate's Adventure - Treasure of the Seven Seas" at the Magic Kingdom park
 Designed and wrote the Menehune Adventure Trail game at the Disney Aulani Resort and Spa on Oahu. Ackley and colleague Chris Purvis discussed the game in a panel at the Game Developer's Conference. https://www.gdcvault.com/play/1019903/Location-Based-Interactive-Storytelling-the 
 Was the Executive Creative Director for the Play Disney Parks mobile application, delivering interactive theme park content to visitors to Disney's US resorts. A reviewer for familychoiceawards.com  said of the app, " It makes exploring and enjoying Walt Disney World and Disneyland Resort even more fun, if you can believe that."
 Was Executive Creative Director for the Disney Team of Heroes, a mobile application designed to "(bring) joy to patients at Children’s Hospitals."
The New York Film Academy Game Design hosted Ackley for a 2019 in conversation as part of its "Masters of Game Design" series.

At the beginning of 2021, Ackley left the Walt Disney Company after nearly two decades of work. Most recently he has joined the mixed reality studio Animal Repair Shop as its Vice President of Product Innovation.

Games
1993 Day of the Tentacle, programmer (LucasArts)
1993 Sam & Max Hit the Road, programmer (LucasArts)
1994 Cadillacs and Dinosaurs: The Second Cataclysm, associate game designer (Rocket Science Games)
1994 Loadstar: The Legend of Tully Bodine, Associate Game Designer and voice actor, character "Scorpion" (Rocket Science Games)
1995 Full Throttle, programmer (LucasArts)
1995 The Dig, programmer (LucasArts)
1997 The Curse of Monkey Island, co-project leader (LucasArts)
1997-2020: See list above for major projects for the Walt Disney Company
2012 Sorcerers of the Magic Kingdom, co-designer (The Walt Disney Company)

References

External links
 

Year of birth missing (living people)
Living people
Lucasfilm people
American video game designers
American video game directors